The Enigma of the Shah is an Iranian historical drama television series, directed by Mohammad Reza Varzi. The story focuses on Mohammad Reza Pahlavi, the final Shah of Iran, and the events leading up to the Iranian Revolution which led to the abolition of the monarchy.

It aired on cable network IRIB TV1 from 12 January 2014 - October 2016 over 41 episodes.

Cinematographers 

Cinematography was conducted by Mansour Zohuri, Seyed Meysam Hosseini, Mehdi Rasouli, and Mehdi Shirdel.

Synopsis 
When Reza Shah abdicates, who will become the next Shah? Who has the power to maintain Iran's sovereignty and independence?

Cast

Main cast
 Hossein Nour Ali as Mohammad Reza Pahlavi
 Amiril Arjomand as Mahmoud Vaziri

People around Pahlavi
 Jafar Dehghan as Reza Shah
 Hadis Fooladvand as Fawzia Fuad of Egypt
 Mehraveh Sharifinia as Soraya Esfandiary-Bakhtiari
 Saghar Azizi as Farah Diba
 Mojgan Rabbani as Ashraf Pahlavi
 Mohammad-Ali Najafi as Ahmad Qavam
 Nader Soleimani as Shaban Jafari

People around Vaziri
 Saeed NikPour as Ahmad Vaziri
 Gohar Kheirandish as Tooba
 Narges Mohamad as Golnar
 Azadeh EsmaeelKhani as NoorAfagh
 Yousof Teymoori as Amir Masoud
 Roz Razavi as Azar Etemadi
 Mohammad-Reza Sharifinia as Jafar Mehrdad
 Shokrekhoda Goudarzi as Ruhollah Khomeini
 Reza Fayazi as Churchill
 Afsaneh Naseri as Farideh Diba

Original soundtrack

Recognition

References

Sources 
 Main Page moamaeshah.ir - 8 November 2015

External links 

 

2010s Iranian television series
Iranian television series
Iranian Revolution films
Films about Mohammad Reza Pahlavi
Films set in Iran
Islamic Republic of Iran Broadcasting original programming
Persian-language television shows
Television shows set in Iran
Works about Ruhollah Khomeini
Works about Ali Shariati